

Laos 

Population figures of districts from 2015 Laos Census.

Latvia

Lebanon

Lesotho

Liberia

Libya 

Figures below are 2021 estimates  from World Population Review.

Lithuania

Luxembourg

Madagascar

Malawi

Malaysia

Maldives

Mali

Malta

No city in Malta has 100,000 or more inhabitants. The table below shows the population of Valletta metropolitan area in 2015, as per Eurostat.

Mauritania

Mauritius

Mexico

Moldova

Mongolia

Montenegro

Morocco

Mozambique

Myanmar (Burma)

Namibia

Nepal

Netherlands

New Zealand

Nicaragua

Niger

Nigeria 

The following table lists fully defined incorporated cities in Nigeria, with a population of at least 100,000, as declared by the Nigerian National Population Commission in the 2006 National census.

North Macedonia

Norway

Oman

See also
 World largest cities

References

2014 United Nations Demographic Yearbook (Table 8: Population of capital cities and cities of 100,000 or more inhabitants: latest available year, 1995 - 2014) United Nations Statistics Division, accessed 15 November 2016

Towns and cities with 100,000 or more inhabitants
100,000 or more inhabitants
L